Daniel Collopy (born 1 February 1978) is an Australian actor.

Career
His first television role was in 2000 as the character of Sean Edwards in the long-running Australian soap Neighbours. Following this Collopy was offered a regular role in another long-running Australian soap Home and Away where he played lifeguard turned town mayor Josh West from 2001 until 2003 with further guest appearances in both 2005 and 2006. In 2003, he was nominated for a Logie Award being for Logie Award for Most Popular New Male Talent for his role in Home and Away. Collopy has guest starred in Packed to the Rafters, the police drama series City Homicide, and the comedy series Jesters.

References

External links
 

1978 births
Living people
Australian male television actors
20th-century Australian male actors
21st-century Australian male actors